Dmitri Gennadyevich Nezhelev (born 27 February 1970) is a retired Turkmenistani professional footballer.

Career
He made his professional debut in the Soviet Second League in 1988 for Köpetdag Aşgabat.

His younger brother Anatoli Nezhelev is also a professional footballer.

References

External links
 

1970 births
Living people
Sportspeople from Ashgabat
Soviet footballers
Turkmenistan footballers
Association football midfielders
Turkmenistan international footballers
Turkmenistan expatriate footballers
Turkmenistan expatriate sportspeople in Russia
Turkmenistan expatriate sportspeople in Belarus
Turkmenistan expatriate sportspeople in Azerbaijan
Expatriate footballers in Russia
Expatriate footballers in Belarus
Expatriate footballers in Azerbaijan
Russian Premier League players
FK Köpetdag Aşgabat players
FC Ural Yekaterinburg players
FC Zenit Saint Petersburg players
FC Kristall Smolensk players
FC Darida Minsk Raion players
Khazar Lankaran FK players
Footballers at the 1998 Asian Games
Asian Games competitors for Turkmenistan